Asteras Parapotamos Football Club is a Greek football club, based in Parapotamos, Thesprotia, Greece.

Honors

Domestic Titles and honors

 Thesprotia FCA Champions: 6
 1994-95, 1996–97, 2000–01, 2002–03, 2010–11, 2016–17
 Thesprotia FCA Cup Winners: 2
 2003-04, 2006–07
 Thesprotia FCA Super Cup Winners: 1
 2016-17

References

Football clubs in Epirus
Thesprotia
Association football clubs established in 1980
1980 establishments in Greece
Gamma Ethniki clubs